Al Ras ("The Cape") is a locality in Dubai, the United Arab Emirates. It is the westernmost locality in the area of Deira and borders the Dubai Creek to the west and south, and Al Dhagaya and Al Buteen to the east.  Al Ras, literally meaning The Cape, is one of the oldest communities in Deira. It is bounded on the north, south and west by route D 85 (Al Baniyas Road) and to the east by Old Baladiya Street (110th Road).

Important landmarks in Al Ras include the Dubai Gold Souk, Dubai Spice Souk,  Al Ras Hotel, and St. George Hotel. Al Ras Public Library (aka Dubai Public Library) is the oldest public library in Dubai. It was inaugurated by Sheikh Rashid bin Saeed Al Maktoum in 1963, but closed for renovations in 2019.

Al Ras metro station on the Green Line of the Dubai Metro serves the area.

Gallery

References

Communities in Dubai